Church of the Holy Cross (Vozdvizhenskaya, Zdvyzhenska, Nadstavna) is the oldest church in Ternopil in western Ukraine. It is an architectural monument of national importance which was built at the end of the 16th century. It is located on a hill overlooking Ternopil Pond.

Churches in Ukraine
Buildings and structures in Ternopil Oblast
Churches in Ternopil
Churches of the Orthodox Church of Ukraine